This is a list of now defunct airlines from Turkmenistan.

See also
List of airlines of Turkmenistan
List of airports in Turkmenistan

References

Airlines
Turkmenistan

Airlines, defunct